Rabbit Fall is a Canadian television supernatural drama series, which aired on Space, APTN and Saskatchewan Communications Network.

The series stars Andrea Menard as Tara Wheaton, a police officer of Métis descent who takes a job in Rabbit Fall, a remote town in northern Saskatchewan with a history of unexplained events; she is reluctant to accept the community's supernatural explanations for the events, but finds that the events challenge her sense of rationality. The series was shot primarily in the community of Duck Lake, Saskatchewan.

The show's cast also includes Kevin Jubinville, Peter Stebbings, Peter Kelly Gaudreault, Tinsel Korey, Patrick Bird, Tamara Podemski and Booth Savage.

Produced by Angel Entertainment, the series premiered in 2007 with a six-episode first season which aired solely on APTN. Its eight-episode second season aired in 2008 on both APTN and Space. The series has not produced any further episodes since 2008, but has sometimes aired in repeats on both APTN and SCN as recently as the late 2010s.

Menard received a Gemini Award nomination for Best Actress in a Drama Series at the 24th Gemini Awards in 2009. The series was nominated for Best Drama Series at the Saskatchewan Motion Picture Industry Association's Showcase Awards in the same year.

References

External links

2000s Canadian drama television series
2007 Canadian television series debuts
2008 Canadian television series endings
Aboriginal Peoples Television Network original programming
CTV Sci-Fi Channel original programming
Television shows set in Saskatchewan
Television shows filmed in Saskatoon
First Nations television series